Shawarmer is a Middle Eastern quick-service restaurant chain specializing in Shawarma. Shawarmer opened its first branch in Riyadh in 1999 and is currently operating in 22 cities in Saudi with 116 branches. Shawarmer's concept revolves around innovating the traditional shawarma, and maintaining international quality standards to their offering, making Shawarmer one of the largest food industry companies in Saudi Arabia.

Awards
The company has received the following awards:
 
 2009 – Listed in Saudi Fast Growth 100.
 2010 – Listed in Saudi Fast Growth 100.
 2013 – Shawarmer management selected as Endeavor Entrepreneur and Ranked 3rd in the Forbes most innovative Saudi entrepreneurs.
 2016 – Top 100 Saudi Brands Award (Al Watan newspaper).
 2017 – Marketing Pioneers Award.

Timeline

The following have been significant developments for the company:

 1999 – Shawarmer was founded and the first branch was opened. 
 2002 – Open first main street location.
 2003 – 5th Store milestone reached.
 2005 – 12th Store milestone reached and first non-traditional location opened.
 2008 – Expanded the first market outside of Riyadh and Jeddah – major brand overhaul and new re-engineered menu with a focus on multiple categories.
 2011 – 20th Store Milestone Reached, Started franchising in Yanbu and Khobar, changed menu structure and introduced LTOs.
 2019 – Opened its 100th restaurant.

References

External links

1999 establishments in Saudi Arabia
Restaurants established in 1999
Food and drink companies of Saudi Arabia
Saudi Arabian brands
Companies based in Riyadh